Indirect presidential elections were held in the Republic of the Congo on 19 December 1963 after President Fulbert Youlou had been overthrown in the Trois Glorieuses uprising on 15 August. Alphonse Massamba-Débat was the only candidate, and was elected unopposed.

Results

References

Presidential elections in the Republic of the Congo
Congo
1963 in the Republic of the Congo
Single-candidate elections
Congo